McCallum is a British television series that was produced by STV Productions (Scottish Television) and ran from 1995 to 1998.

Dr Iain McCallum was the original lead character, played by Scottish actor John Hannah. McCallum is a forensic pathologist working in the morgue of St. Patrick's Hospital in London's East End, who travels by Triumph Motorcycle, is generally charming and solves murders. The character has romantic involvements with two of the other principal characters, Joanna Sparks (played by Suzanna Hamilton), and later Dr. Angela Moloney (played by Zara Turner). The last episode did not include McCallum and Angela as the story stated that they had taken jobs in America. They were replaced by Dr. Dan Gallagher (Nathaniel Parker) and Dr. Charley Fielding (Eva Pope).

Cast
 John Hannah as Dr. Iain McCallum
 Zara Turner as Dr. Angela Moloney
 Gerard Murphy as DI Braken 
 Alex Walkinshaw as DS Small
 James Saxon as Fuzzy Brightons
 Richard O'Callaghan as Bobby Sykes
 Richard Moore as Sir Paddy Penfold
 Suzanna Hamilton as Joanna Sparks
 Charlotte Randle as Clare Gilmore
 Hugo Speer as Dr. Aidan Petit
 Nathaniel Parker as Dr. Dan Gallagher
 Eva Pope as Dr. Charley Fielding

Episodes

Pilot (1995)

Series 1 (1997)

Series 2 (1998)

Special (1998)

References

External links 
 Review of "McCallum, the Complete Series", by Matthew A. Stern, PopMatters, 2006.

1995 Scottish television series debuts
1998 Scottish television series endings
1990s British drama television series
Scottish television shows
ITV television dramas
Television shows produced by Scottish Television
English-language television shows
1990s Scottish television series